Číž is a spa village and municipality in the Rimavská Sobota District of the Banská Bystrica Region of southern Slovakia.

History
In historical records, the village was first mentioned in 1274 (as Chyz). It first belonged to the Tukovci (Tuky) family and later to several zeman families. In 1566 and 1682, the village was destroyed by the Turks. From 1938 to 1945, Číž was occupied by Hungary under the First Vienna Award.

Genealogical resources

The records for genealogical research are available at the state archive "Statny Archiv in Banska Bystrica, Slovakia"

 Roman Catholic church records (births/marriages/deaths): 1740-1896 (parish B)

See also
 List of municipalities and towns in Slovakia

References

External links
http://www.e-obce.sk/obec/ciz/ciz.html
Surnames of living people in Ciz

Villages and municipalities in Rimavská Sobota District
Hungarian communities in Slovakia